The 1936 Memorial Cup final was the 18th junior ice hockey championship of the Canadian Amateur Hockey Association. The George Richardson Memorial Trophy champions West Toronto Nationals of the Ontario Hockey Association in Eastern Canada competed against the Abbott Cup champions Saskatoon Wesleys of the Saskatchewan Junior Hockey League in Western Canada. In a best-of-three series, held at Maple Leaf Gardens in Toronto, Ontario, West Toronto won their 1st Memorial Cup, defeating  Saskatoon 2 games to 0.

Scores
Game 1: West Toronto 5-1 Saskatoon
Game 2: West Toronto 4-2 Saskatoon

Winning roster
Bert Conacher, Roy Conacher, Bucky Crawford, D. Fritz, Carl Gamble, Ginger Hall, Red Heron, Bill Jennings, Bob Laurent, F. Murray, Peanut O'Flaherty, Ted Robertson, Gord Shill, Bill Thomson.  Coach: Hap Day

References

External links
 Memorial Cup
 Canadian Hockey League

1935–36 in Canadian ice hockey
Memorial Cup tournaments
Ice hockey competitions in Toronto
Memorial Cup
1930s in Toronto